The Bavarian Class D II was a German goods train tender locomotive with the Bavarian Eastern Railway (Bayrische Ostbahn).

The two engines, with the names Deggendorf und Bayrischer Wald were built by the Deggendorf-Plattling Railway for their branch line and taken over in 1867 by the Ostbahn. On the nationalisation of the Ostbahn, the Royal Bavarian State Railways initially incorporated the engines into group E, and later into group D as the Class D II.

See also 
 Royal Bavarian State Railways
 List of Bavarian locomotives and railbuses

0-4-0T locomotives
D 02 Ostbahn
Standard gauge locomotives of Germany
Maffei locomotives
Railway locomotives introduced in 1866
B n2t locomotives